Margo Lillian Jefferson (born October 17, 1947) is an American writer and academic.

Biography
Jefferson received her B.A. from Brandeis University, where she graduated cum laude, and her M.S. from the Columbia University Graduate School of Journalism. She became an associate editor at Newsweek in 1973 and stayed at the magazine until 1978. She then served as an assistant professor at the Department of Journalism and Mass Communication at New York University from 1979 to 1983 and from 1989 to 1991. Since then she has taught at the Columbia University School of the Arts, where she is now professor of professional practice in writing. Jefferson also taught at The New School's Eugene Lang College of Liberal Arts.

She joined The New York Times in 1993, initially as a book reviewer, then went on to win the Pulitzer Prize for Criticism in 1995. She also served as the newspaper's theater critic in 2004. In addition to the Times, she has written for Vogue, New York Magazine, The Nation, and Guernica.

Jefferson has a longstanding interest in jazz, and appeared in Ken Burns's 2001 documentary series about the history of the music.

Writing
Jefferson's 2006 book, On Michael Jackson, was described by Publishers Weekly as a "slim, smart volume of cultural analysis." According to Lucy Scholes in The Independent: "The excellent On Michael Jackson is not a straightforward biography, nor is it an attempt to claim either his innocence or his guilt when it comes to the child abuse scandals that, although he was acquitted, haunt his afterlife. A 'deciphering' is probably the most accurate description of the book, the shrewd playfulness of Jefferson’s prose the perfect vehicle for analysis that’s as smart as it is readable."

Jefferson's autobiographical book, Negroland, was published to acclaim in 2015. It was described by Dwight Garner in The New York Times as a "powerful and complicated memoir", and by Margaret Busby in The Sunday Times as "utterly compelling", while Anita Sethi wrote in The Observer: "Jefferson fascinatingly explores how her personal experience intersected with politics, from the civil rights movement to feminism, as well as history before her birth." Tracy K. Smith wrote in The New York Times: "The visible narrative apparatus of 'Negroland' highlights its author’s extreme vulnerability in the face of her material. It also makes apparent the all-too-often invisible fallout of our nation’s ongoing obsession with race and class: Namely, that living a life as an exemplar of black excellence — and living with the survivor’s guilt that often accompanies such excellence — can have a psychic effect nearly as deadening and dehumanizing as that of racial injustice itself." In 2016 Negroland was shortlisted for the Baillie Gifford Prize for Non-Fiction and won the National Book Critics Circle Award in the Autobiography category.

Jefferson is a contributor to the 2019 anthology New Daughters of Africa, edited by Margaret Busby.

In 2022, Jefferson was the recipient of a Windham-Campbell Literature Prize in the category of non-fiction. Her book Constructing a Nervous System was a finalist for ALA 2023 Carnegie Medal and the 2023 National Book Critics Circle award in criticism. The book was shortlisted for the Rathbones Folio prize.

Awards
1995: Pulitzer Prize for Criticism, winner for her book reviews and other cultural analyses in The New York Times.
2016: National Book Critics Circle Award (Autobiography), winner for her memoir Negroland.
2016: Shortlisted for the Baillie Gifford Prize for Non-Fiction, for Negroland
2022: Windham-Campbell Literature Prize (non-fiction)

Bibliography

Books

Selected essays and reporting
 "Ripping Off Black Music", Harper's Magazine, January 1973.
 "Seducified by a Minstrel Show", The New York Times, May 22, 1994.
 "On Writers and Writing; Authentic American", The New York Times, February 18, 2001.
 "On the Home Front, the Personal Becomes Theatrical (and Political, Too)", The New York Times, December 11, 2004.
 
 "How Michelle Obama expanded the definition of a first lady", The Guardian, January 6, 2017.
 "No Cinderella: Margo Jefferson on the real Meghan Markle", The Guardian, May 5, 2018.
 "Was I in denial? Margo Jefferson on Michael Jackson's legacy", The Guardian, June 7, 2019.

References

External links

 Tim Adams, "Margo Jefferson: ‘I was anxious about using the word Negro in a book title’" (interview), The Observer, May 22, 2016.
 "Margo Jefferson: The Books in My Life | On the Pleasures of Poetry and (Not) Reading the Russians", Lit Hub, August 23, 2016.
 "Margo Jefferson interview", The Baillie Gifford Prize for Non-Fiction, 2016.
 Arifa Akbar, "Margo Jefferson: ‘I have always loved Michael Jackson’" (interview), The Guardian, May 5, 2018.
 Zinzi Clemmons, "Interview with Margo Jefferson", The White Review, October 2018.

1947 births
20th-century American journalists
20th-century American non-fiction writers
20th-century American women writers
21st-century American journalists
21st-century American non-fiction writers
21st-century American women writers
African-American women journalists
African-American journalists
American magazine editors
American memoirists
American theater critics
American women journalists
American women memoirists
Brandeis University alumni
Columbia University Graduate School of Journalism alumni
Columbia University faculty
Critics employed by The New York Times
Living people
Newsweek people
Place of birth missing (living people)
Pulitzer Prize for Criticism winners
American women critics
20th-century African-American writers
21st-century African-American writers
20th-century African-American women writers
21st-century African-American women writers